Chaos and Desire is a Canadian drama film, released in 2002. Written and directed by Manon Briand, the film stars Pascale Bussières as Alice Bradley, a seismologist returning to her hometown of Baie-Comeau, Quebec to investigate a mysterious interruption in the tidal flow on the St. Lawrence River.

The film also stars Jean-Nicolas Verreault as Marc Vandal, a local pilot whose wife's recent death in a plane crash may be central to the tidal mystery; Julie Gayet as Catherine Rolland, Alice's lesbian friend from college who helps her investigate; and Geneviève Bujold as Colette Lasalle, the owner of the local diner who is convinced that the mystery has a supernatural explanation. Other supporting cast members include Vincent Bilodeau and Gabriel Arcand.

See also 
 List of LGBT films directed by women

References

External links 

2002 films
Baie-Comeau
Canadian drama films
Canadian LGBT-related films
LGBT-related drama films
2002 drama films
2002 LGBT-related films
Films set in Quebec
Films directed by Manon Briand
Films produced by Luc Besson
French-language Canadian films
2000s Canadian films